This list is intended to be a complete compilation of properties and districts listed on the National Register of Historic Places in Rensselaer County, New York, United States. Seven of the properties are further designated National Historic Landmarks.

Rensselaer County sits east of the Hudson River in New York's Capital District and borders both Massachusetts and Vermont on the east. The area was originally inhabited by the Mohican Indian tribe until it was bought by the Dutch jeweler and merchant Kiliaen van Rensselaer in 1630 and incorporated into his patroonship Rensselaerswyck (which, in turn, was part of the Dutch colony New Netherland). The area now known as Rensselaer County passed into English hands in 1664, the Dutch regained control of it for a year in 1673, and the English resumed control in 1674. From 1674 until 1776 (the year of American independence), the area was under English or British control.

Rensselaer County came into existence as a governmental entity in 1791, when it was established on lands that were previously part of Albany County. Rensselaer County consists of the cities of Rensselaer and Troy), as well as fourteen towns: Berlin, Brunswick, East Greenbush, Grafton, Hoosick, Nassau, North Greenbush, Petersburgh, Pittstown, Poestenkill, Sand Lake, Schaghticoke, Schodack, and Stephentown. The County also contains six villages: Castleton, East Nassau, Hoosick Falls, Nassau, Schaghticoke, and Valley Falls.

The locations of those National Register properties and districts in Rensselaer County for which latitude and longitude coordinates are listed below may be seen on a map by clicking on the links available within the table above and to the right, which allows readers to map all coordinates using online maps.



Countywide listings

|}

See also

National Register of Historic Places listings in New York
List of New York State Historic Markers in Rensselaer County, New York

References and notes

Rensselaer County